Dirty Work is a Pre-Code Laurel and Hardy short film classic comedy made in 1933. It was directed by Lloyd French, produced by Hal Roach and distributed by MGM.

Plot
The film is set in the home of a mad scientist called Professor Noodle, who has just developed a rejuvenation solution that reverses the aging process. Stan and Oliver are chimney sweeps and arrive to sweep the chimney. Oliver goes on to the roof and Stan stays below at the fireplace. Stan begins to shove the sweep up the chimney and knocks Oliver backwards and down through the skylight. Oliver comes back on to the roof and begins to pull the sweep up. Stan has hung on to the sweep and arrives at the roof. Oliver drops him back down through the chimney. Stan doesn't have enough extensions for the sweep and decides to use a rifle to shove the sweep the last part of the way. The gun goes off nearly shooting Oliver. Stan decides to go up to the roof and as he opens the skylight he knocks Oliver off the roof and down onto a greenhouse. Hardy finally falls down the chimney dislodging many bricks, sending a cloud of soot all over the living room and onto the butler, and damaging the piano. The butler says something about an electric chair, and stalks out. Stan and Oliver start to clean up the soot around the fireplace. They become distracted and Stan shovels the soot into Oliver's trousers. Meanwhile, the rather sooty butler is having a much-needed bath.

Professor Noodle decides to test his rejuvenation solution. He puts a duck in a vat of water and adds a drop of his solution. The water agitates for a few seconds, and the duck turns into a duckling. The professor is excited and decides to show Stan and Oliver his discovery. He puts another drop of his solution into the vat, the water again froths and swirls briefly, and the duckling turns into an egg. Stan and Oliver decide to test the solution for themselves when the professor leaves the room to fetch and rejuvenate the butler. As Oliver is on a stepladder leaning over the vat with a huge beaker of the rejuvenation solution, Stan gets the eyedropper but accidentally knocks Oliver and the container of solution into the vat. After churning and gurgling tumultuously for some moments as the excessively-large amount of solution and water mix (accompanied by agonized screams and whooping yowls from Oliver), the vat eventually settles back down, and Oliver emerges as a chimpanzee wearing a derby. Stan plaintively asks if Ollie still knows him and will speak to him. Despite being "rejuvenated" — de-evolved, even — into a "basic primate" by the massive overdose of the solution, Oliver is still able to say what he has said multiple times throughout the film, "I have nothing to say."

Cast
 Stan Laurel as Stan
 Oliver Hardy as Ollie
 Lucien Littlefield as Professor Noodle (uncredited)
 Samuel Adams as Jessup the Butler (uncredited)
 Jiggs the Chimp as De-evolved Ollie (uncredited)

References

External links
 
 
 

1933 films
1933 comedy films
American black-and-white films
Films directed by Lloyd French
Laurel and Hardy (film series)
Metro-Goldwyn-Mayer short films
1933 short films
American comedy short films
1930s English-language films
1930s American films